This is a list of current first-class cricket teams, organised first by country and then alphabetically. A first class match is one of three or more days' scheduled duration between two sides of eleven players each and is officially adjudged to be worthy of the status by virtue of the standard of the competing teams. Matches must allow for the teams to play two innings each.

Where a team plays at more than one home ground, only their main ground is listed here.

Afghanistan

National team: Afghanistan national cricket team1
Beginning in 2017, Afghanistan domestic matches have had first-class and List A status.

Australia

National team: Australia national cricket team

Bangladesh
National team: Bangladesh national cricket team 

Notes:
 Bangladesh A and Bangladeshis matches are also considered first-class.

England and Wales

National team: England cricket team

India

National team: India national cricket team 

Notes:
1 Rest of India (in the Irani Trophy), India A, and various President's XIs are also adjudged first-class.
2 Makeshift zonal teams are also made and guest teams like England lions also play.

Ireland

Ireland's Inter-Provincial Championship received first-class status in October 2016 from the ICC. The first-class status for the matches came into effect with the 2017 Inter-Provincial Championship.

National team: Ireland cricket team

New Zealand

National team: New Zealand national cricket team

Pakistan

National team: Pakistan national cricket team

South Africa

National team: South Africa national cricket team 

Notes:
1 Also considered first-class when playing in the ICC Intercontinental Cup.

Sri Lanka

National team: Sri Lanka national cricket team

West Indies

National team: West Indies cricket team 

Note: West Indies 'A' and West Indian XI matches are also considered first-class.

Zimbabwe

National team: Zimbabwe national cricket team

Countries with international first-class cricket

The following countries play first-class cricket as an international team in certain circumstances.

Hong Kong

National team: Hong Kong national cricket team1

Note:
1 first-class only when playing in the ICC Intercontinental Cup.

Namibia

National team: Namibia national cricket team1

Note:
1 first-class only when playing in the ICC Intercontinental Cup and in the South African SAA Provincial Challenge against South African first-class teams.

Netherlands

National team: Netherlands national cricket team1

Note:
1 first-class only when playing in the ICC Intercontinental Cup.

Papua New Guinea

National team: Papua New Guinea national cricket team1

Note:
1 first-class only when playing in the ICC Intercontinental Cup.

Scotland

National team: Scotland national cricket team1 
                               
Note:
1 first-class only when playing in the ICC Intercontinental Cup or when playing against Ireland or English first-class county teams.

United Arab Emirates

National team: United Arab Emirates national cricket team1

Note:
1 first-class only when playing in the ICC Intercontinental Cup.

Former first-class cricket teams

Bermuda
National team: Bermuda national cricket team

Note:
1 first-class only when playing in the ICC Intercontinental Cup.

Canada

National team: Canada national cricket team1

Note:
1 first-class only when playing in the ICC Intercontinental Cup.

Cayman Islands

National team: Cayman Islands national cricket team1

Note:
1 first-class only when playing in the ICC Intercontinental Cup.

Kenya

National team: Kenya national cricket team 1

Note:
1 first-class only when playing in the ICC Intercontinental Cup and against touring first-class teams.

Malaysia

National team: Malaysia national cricket team1

Note:
1 first-class only when playing in the ICC Intercontinental Cup.

Nepal

National team: Nepal national cricket team1
 
Note:
1first-class only when playing in the ICC Intercontinental Cup.

Uganda

National team: Uganda national cricket team1

Note:
1 first-class only when playing in the ICC Intercontinental Cup.

United States

National team: United States national cricket team1

Note:
1 first-class only when playing in the ICC Intercontinental Cup.

External links
cricinfo
cricketarchive

References 

First-class cricket teams
FIrst-class
Cricket